Konstantin Nikolayevich Leontiev, monastic name: Clement (January 25, 1831 in Kudinovo, Kaluga Governorate – November 24, 1891 in Sergiyev Posad) was a conservative tsarist and imperial monarchist Russian philosopher who advocated closer cultural ties between Russia and the East against what he believed to be the West's catastrophic egalitarian, utilitarian and revolutionary influences. He also advocated Russia's cultural and territorial expansion eastward to India, Tibet and China.

Life 
Leontiev was born and grew up on his father's estate. His father, a nobleman, was a military officer but was discharged for "riotous behaviour". Still, the intervention of the Russian empress in behalf of the Leontiev brothers made him able to enter the Imperial Corps of Pages. He was engaged at 23 but broke off the relationship for the sake of "freedom and art" a decision that made things difficult for him. After completing medical school in Moscow, Leontiev saw service as a doctor during the Crimean War.

In 1861, he carried off a local Crimean girl, the daughter of a Greek merchant, from Feodosiya, eventually marrying her.

He later lived in various Ottoman towns as a Russian consular agent, devoting his leisure time to writing oriental fiction on many themes, some of which included a condemnation of anti-homosexuality and implied that he may have been bisexual. In the summer of 1871, after praying to the Virgin Mary, he was cured of cholera and dysentery and promised Her to take monastic vows. Later that fall, he moved to the Russian monastery on Mount Athos. In 1880, he moved to the censorship department in Moscow, where he published several acclaimed analyses of Leo Tolstoy's novels.

Seven years later, he secretly took the tonsure at the Optina monastery, famous for its startsy. He died as a monk in the Troitse-Sergiyeva Lavra.

Works and political thought 

Leontiev's most remarkable book is a volume of essays, The East, Russia, and Slavdom (1885–1886). Like Nikolay Danilevsky and Fyodor Dostoyevsky before him, he was ill at ease with the Western consumer society and the cult of material prosperity. Leontiev regarded traditional Russian Byzantinism as a blessing and a strong antidote against further liberalisation of the country's society. His aesthetic and political theories had some similarities to those of Friedrich Nietzsche and Oswald Spengler. Preceding the latter's theory of the cyclical nature of civilizations and The Decline of the West by several decades, Leontiev proposed that all societies undergo a state of flowering and increasing complexity followed by one of "secondary simplification", decay and, ultimately, death. Leontiev felt that the West had reached the beginning of secondary simplification.

A pessimist, Leontiev made several predictions that turned out to come true. He prophesied that in the 20th century, there would be a bloody revolution in Russia led by an "anti-Christ" that would be socialist and tyrannical in nature and whose rulers would wield even more power than their tsarist predecessors. He said, "Socialism is the feudalism of the future". He felt that only the harshest reaction could prevent that scenario.

He also predicted that Germany would grow strong enough to fight up to two wars against Russia and that China also would eventually threaten Russia's power. He also claimed that technology would one day lead to universal destruction.

See also 

Russian philosophy
Sobornost

Sources 
Against the Current: Selected Writings, Konstantin Leontiev, Wybright and Talley Publishers, New York, 1969.

References

External links
  knleontiev.narod.ru
  Leontiev page at Pravoslavie.ru

1831 births
1891 deaths
People from Yukhnovsky District
People from Meshchovsky Uyezd
Monks from the Russian Empire
Philosophers from the Russian Empire
Writers from the Russian Empire
Monarchists from the Russian Empire
Russian monarchists
Eastern Orthodox philosophers
Russian nationalists
Russian Orthodox monks
19th-century Christian monks
19th-century people from the Russian Empire